Fancy Bazaar is a locality in Guwahati, surrounded by localities of Pan Bazaar, Lakhtokia with nearest airport at Borjhar and Railway Station at Paltan Bazaar. It is known as the business hub of Northeast region.  It derives its name from the Jail and gallows for hanging (phansi) that was situated in this area—the municipal records still calls it Phansi bazaar.

Commercial viability
Fancy Bazaar is busy commercial area as central location of various commercial enterprises.

See also
 Ulubari
 Lokhra
 Ghoramara
 Jalukbari

References

Neighbourhoods in Guwahati